Christopher George Paul Garia (born December 16, 1992) is a Dutch sprinter and former baseball player from Curaçao. Garia won the 60 metres at the 2018 Dutch National Indoor Championships in a time of 6.70 seconds. He was also a member of the Dutch national baseball team before completing his transformation to sprinter.

Baseball career 
Garia played for the Texas Rangers organization.

On August 25, 2016, he was selected for the 2016 France International Baseball Tournament.

On September 7, 2016, he was selected for the 2016 European Baseball Championship.

On October 26, 2016, he was selected for the exhibition games against Japan.

On February 7, 2017, he was selected for the training camp in the United States.

On February 9, 2017, he was selected for the 2017 World Baseball Classic. But on February 26, 2017, he canceled for participate.

References

External links

1992 births
Living people
Baseball outfielders
Curaçao expatriate baseball players in the United States
Curaçao male sprinters
Dominican Summer League Rangers players
Curaçao expatriate baseball players in the Dominican Republic
Frisco RoughRiders players
Hickory Crawdads players
High Desert Mavericks players
Lincoln Saltdogs players
Myrtle Beach Pelicans players
National baseball team players
People from Willemstad
Round Rock Express players
Spokane Indians players
Vaessen Pioniers players
2016 European Baseball Championship players
Athletes (track and field) at the 2020 Summer Olympics
Olympic athletes of the Netherlands